John Young (born 22 October 1951 in Edinburgh) is a Scottish former association football player and manager.

Young was appointed assistant manager of Arbroath in March 2016.

References

External links

1951 births
Living people
Footballers from Edinburgh
Association football defenders
Scottish footballers
Scottish expatriate footballers
Expatriate footballers in Hong Kong
Falkirk F.C. players
St Mirren F.C. players
Hong Kong Rangers FC players
Queen of the South F.C. players
Brechin City F.C. players
Arbroath F.C. players
Scottish Football League players
Scottish expatriate sportspeople in Hong Kong
Scottish football managers
Arbroath F.C. managers
Brechin City F.C. managers
Hibernian F.C. players
Broxburn Athletic F.C. players
Scottish Football League managers